Kenan Fatkič (born 20 August 1997) is a Slovenian professional footballer who plays as a midfielder for Swiss club Neuchâtel Xamax.

Professional career
Fatkič joined FC Thun on 11 June 2018 after a successful debut season with FC Chiasso in the Swiss Challenge League. Fatkič made his professional debut for Thun in a 2-1 Swiss Super League loss to FC Zürich on 22 July 2018.

On 18 May 2022, Fatkič signed a two-year contract with Neuchâtel Xamax.

References

External links
 
 NZS Profile
 FC Thun Profile
 SFL Profile

1997 births
Living people
Slovenian footballers
Slovenia under-21 international footballers
FC Thun players
FC Chiasso players
Neuchâtel Xamax FCS players
Swiss Super League players
Swiss Challenge League players
Association football midfielders
Slovenian expatriate footballers
Slovenian expatriate sportspeople in Switzerland
Expatriate footballers in Switzerland